Protea caffra (sometimes called the common protea), native to South Africa, is a small tree or shrub which occurs in open or wooded grassland, usually on rocky ridges. Its leaves are leathery and hairless. The flower head is solitary or in clusters of 3 or 4 with the involucral bracts a pale red, pink or cream colour. The fruit is a densely hairy nut. The species is highly variable and has several subspecies. 

Protea is a flowering plant genus in the family Proteaceae. The species epithet caffra is derived from Kaffraria, the 17th century geographical name for the eastern regions of South Africa, especially Natal where the shrub was first discovered by Ferdinand Krauss in December/January 1839/40. P. caffra has never attracted much attention from horticulturalists. It was induced to flower at Kew Gardens in May 1893, but this failed to kindle any further interest in the species. Its chief claim to fame is that it was illustrated on the reverse of a South African coin called the "tickey", the equivalent of the British threepenny bit, for almost 30 years until the coin was withdrawn in 1961.

Description
Upright shrub to small tree 3 – 8m in height with a definite main stem up to 400mm in diameter, crown uneven and spreading. Bark black to dark brown with net-like fissures when mature. Leaves linear-elliptic to linear-falcate, narrow to broadly elliptic, narrow to broadly invert lanceolate, occasionally falcate; 70 – 250mm in length, 4 – 45mm wide, tips blunt to acuminate; smooth, leathery to thin and papery, light green to glaucous green, have a tendency to clump in each year's growth. Flowers carried at the end of leafy twigs 4 – 12mm in diameter, usually singly but up to 4 heads may be grouped at the tip; globose to egg-shaped, broad and shallow when fully open, 45 – 80mm in diameter, base broad convex to flat, 20 – 30mm in diameter. Involucral bracts in 6 – 8 series; outer series broad oval to deltoid, 10 – 20mm wide, 5 – 7mm long, usually with silky silvery pelt of varying thickness at the distal ends but may be hairless, closely and densely shingled; inner series elongated to broadly elongated spatulate, 30 – 50mm long, 10 – 20mm wide, tips rounded to almost acuminate, slightly concave, smooth, varying in color from pale cream to brick red; very variable.

Subspecies
P. caffra caffra
P. caffra gazensis
P. caffra kilimandscharica
P. caffra mafingensis
P. caffra nyasea

Habitat
Protea caffra subsp. caffra is widely distributed across the eastern reaches of South Africa (Gauteng, Kwazulu-Natal, Northern Province, Mpumalanga, the Eastern Cape as far south as the Katberg mountains) and Lesotho. It prefers poor, quartzitic, acidic soils, but is equally at home on a wide variety of well-drained soils and has even been found on alkaline dolomitic soils. It occurs from sea level to 2100m, always on southern slopes where the terrain is broken and rocky, or mountainous. It usually forms open stands in which it is the single large shrub or tree; these stands can cover large areas.

Protea caffra subsp. gazensis occurs in the Eastern Highlands along the border of Mozambique and Zimbabwe, including the Nyanga Mountains and Chimanimani Mountains, and on Mount Gorongosa in Mozambique. It occurs in grasslands and shrublands from 1500 to 2100 meters elevation.<ref>"Species information:Protea caffra subsp. gazensis". Flora of Zimbabwe. Accessed 11 April 2020. </ref>Protea caffra is an exceptionally variable species, and seems to be composed of a mosaic of local races that exhibit small differences, usually in the size, colour, texture and shape of the leaves. Where winters are cold and dry the plant has stiff, thick, pale green leaves, while as the distribution moves westwards the leaves become larger, softer, darker and more pliant. The flowers are generally pinkish-red to carmine with green at the base, and are produced during a clearly defined 6 – 8 week period; this period may begin as early as October in coastal regions, and as late as December in higher regions. The flower heads produce a sweet, slightly sulphurous odour that attracts scarab beetles in large numbers. The dense, fissured bark provides the trees with a large measure of fire resistance. The bark can be used medicinally.

Cultivation
A very hardy perennial shrub that will survive temperatures of at least −5 degrees Celsius. The seeds will germinate in the summer 22 days after planting, and the young plants will reach a height of 10 cm in their first year. Thereafter, growth can be somewhat variable with stops and starts. Should start to bloom from the 6th year, when lower branches should be pruned to stimulate the flowering shoots.

Gallery

References

Sources
van Wyk, B. and van Wyk, P. 1997. Field Guide to trees of South Africa. Struik, Cape Town
Pooley, E. 2005. A Field Guide to Wild Flowers of Kwazulu-Natal and the Eastern Region. National Floral Publications Trust, Durban
Rourke, J. P. 1980. The Proteas of Southern Africa Tafelberg, Cape Town
Roussouw, F. 1970. The Proteaceae of South Africa'' Purnell, Cape Town

External links
 

caffra
Flora of KwaZulu-Natal
Flora of Lesotho
Flora of Mozambique
Flora of Zimbabwe
Flora of the Cape Provinces
Flora of the Northern Provinces
Garden plants of Africa
Ornamental trees
Trees of South Africa
Taxa named by Carl Meissner
Plants described in 1856